Inglenook is an unincorporated community in Mendocino County, California. California State Highway 1 passes through the town, connecting it to Cleone and Fort Bragg to the south and Westport to the north. Ten Mile River passes near the community to the north.

A post office operated at Inglenook from 1880 to 1919.

References

Unincorporated communities in California
Unincorporated communities in Mendocino County, California
Populated coastal places in California